Alexandros Jakupović (born December 14, 1981) is a Greek former tennis player who was banned for life in November 2015 by the Tennis Integrity Unit.

He is the son of a Bosniak father and a Greek mother.

Career 
His career high ATP singles rank is 464, which he achieved on March 9, 2009. As of November 4, 2013,  on the futures level in singles, he has 37  quarter-final losses, 21 semi-final losses, 8 runners-up and 3 titles. As for doubles on the futures level, he has been far more successful. He has 31 semifinal exits, 31 runners-up and 23 titles. On the challenger level in doubles, he has 2 semi-finals, in July 2008 in Rimini, Italy, with Spaniard, Adrián Menéndez-Maceiras and in April 2009 in Athens, Greece with fellow Greek Konstantinos Economidis.  He has 2 challenger doubles finals in April 2008 in Athens, Greece with his compatriot, Konstantinos Economidis and in May 2012 in Athens, Greece with Spaniard Gerard Granollers-Pujol.  His doubles highest career rank was 267, which he achieved on November 17, 2008.  As of November 4,  2013, he was ranked 480 in singles and 533 in doubles.
He also played an important role in the Greece Davis Cup team.

He was banned from the sport for life on November 12, 2015 after having been found guilty of five corruption charges.

References

External links 
 
 
 

Greek male tennis players
1981 births
Living people
Place of birth missing (living people)
Tennis controversies
Sportspeople involved in betting scandals
Sportspeople banned for life
Greek people of Bosnia and Herzegovina descent
Match fixing in tennis
French people of Greek descent
French people of Bosnia and Herzegovina descent
Tennis players from Paris